Pitch Black Prism is the last solo studio album by American hip hop musician Alias. It was released on Anticon in 2014. The album was preceded by the free EP Indiiggo.

Critical reception
David Jeffries of AllMusic gave the album 4 stars out of 5, saying: "Wherever this one fits genre-wise, Alias has figured out how to employ the drift, the sway, and the compressed boom of his early work into other styles of music." He added: "With his study of moods running parallel, the results keep getting better." Rebecca M. Williams of Exclaim! gave the album an 8 out of 10, saying: "Fever Dream gave us a glimpse of his experimental potential three years ago, and he has followed further down the path of exploration with Pitch Black Prism."

Track listing

Personnel
Credits adapted from liner notes.

 Alias – production, arrangement, recording, mixing
 Doseone – lyrics (2), vocals (2)
 Therese Workman – lyrics (9), vocals (9), additional synthesizer (9)
 Daddy Kev – mastering
 Jesse Moretti – cover art, design, layout

References

External links
 
 

2014 albums
Alias (musician) albums
Anticon albums